McBane is a surname. Notable people with the surname include:

Donald McBane (1664–1732), Scottish swordsman
Maria McBane (born 1946), American model and actress

See also
McBain (disambiguation)
McLane